Trismelasmos maculatus is a moth in the family Cossidae. It is found on Java and Sulawesi and in Australia.

Subspecies
Trismelasmos maculatus maculatus (Sulawesi)
Trismelasmos maculatus overbeecki (Draeseke, 1936) (Java)

References

Zeuzerinae
Moths described in 1879